AU Engineering (Danish: Ingeniørområdet ved Aarhus Universitet) is an umbrella organisation of engineering under Aarhus University. It was established in 2011 and currently comprise two engineering organisations; Department of Engineering (ENG) and Aarhus University School of Engineering (ASE).

Departments 
Both Aarhus University School of Engineering and Department of Engineering have their headquarters at the Navitas Park at Aarhus Docklands. Navitas is also home to Aarhus School of Marine and Technical Engineering (AAMS).

References

Sources

External links

 
engineering